Macho peruano que se respeta is a 2015 Peruvian romantic comedy film written and directed by Carlos Landeo in his directorial debut. It stars Carlos Vilchez. It premiered on May 21, 2015 in Peruvian theaters.

Synopsis 
Máximo is a conqueror and within his charismatic and popular neighborhood of the fence he is known as a true "macho who respects himself", however he is a thousand trades that goes from bad to worse. With such a good reputation, one of his friends and disciples will make him a bet that he will not be able to refuse: to make the new neighbor, Carol, fall in love with her, who is known as the most pitiful and difficult woman; achieving it would mean paying off the debt of his workshop and gaining more reputation. But Máximo feels strongly attracted to Sarita, the sweetest girl he has ever met, forcing him to lead a double life, between being a casanova or acting like a true man in love.

Cast 
The actors participating in this film are:

 Carlos Vilchez as Máximo Arriola
 Titi Plaza
 Leisy Suarez
 Rodolfo Carrión “Fellpudini”
 Amparo Brambilla
 Haydeé Cáceres
 Dante del Águila

Reception 
In its first weekend in theaters the film attracted more than 70,000 viewers, the number increased to 180,000 for its second week in theaters.

References

External links 

 

2015 films
2015 romantic comedy films
Peruvian romantic comedy films
Star Films films
2010s Spanish-language films
2010s Peruvian films
Films set in Peru
Films shot in Peru
2015 directorial debut films